Hedersleben may refer to the following places in Saxony-Anhalt, Germany:

Hedersleben, Harz, in the Harz district
Hedersleben, Mansfeld-Südharz, in the Mansfeld-Südharz district